2nd Chance Motorsports was a NASCAR team owned by Rick Russell. It ran the No. 79 Ford Mustang in the Nationwide Series.

History
The team's brief history started when Rick Russell formed his race team in the month of September. After a failed partnership with Specialty Racing, Russell formed his own team. Tim Andrews debuted the team's No. 79 at the fall Dover race with his father Paul Andrews as crew chief. The team made the final five races of the season, but started and parked all of them. Tim moved to Fleur-de-lis Motorsports, and Jennifer Jo Cobb agreed to run the first five races of 2011. However, due to a disagreement between Jo Cobb and Russell over to start and park the 79 at Bristol, and a contract dispute, she and most of the team left 10 minutes before the start of the race and the driver was replaced by Chris Lawson. Russell then hired driver Tim Andrews. After crew chief Kevin Eagle told Russell that he would leave the team after Chicagoland, Russell fired the entire team and did not allow them to collect their belongings until police stepped in. Quote from Tim Andrews, "After the team and I loaded the hauler after the weekend [owner Rick Russell] fired us all and told us to find our own way home". Andrews then moved to Key Motorsports and Russell has not been heard from since.

References

Defunct NASCAR teams